The 2002–03 Deutsche Eishockey Liga season was the 9th season since the founding of the Deutsche Eishockey Liga. The Krefeld Pinguine became German Champions. The Schwenninger ERC Wild Wings lost their license due to insolvency proceedings and the Frankfurt Lions were granted a stay in the league.

Regular season
The eight best placed teams in the regular season would enter playoffs, while the last two teams would have to fight relegation in a playdown series.

GP = Games played, W = Win, SOW = Shootout Win, SOL = Shootout loss, L = Loss
 = Qualified for playoffs  = Season ended  = Relegation playdown

Playdown
The two last-placed teams, the Frankfurt Lions and Schwenninger ERC Wild Wings played a playdown best-of-seven series against relegation.

Despite the Lions having a 25-point advantage in the regular season, the Wild Wings won the playdown series. However, as insolvency proceedings against the Wild Wings opened, the DEL canceled their license and the Lions were allowed to stay in the league.

Playoffs

Quarterfinals
Starting March 12, 2003, the quarterfinals were played in a best-of-seven series.

OT = Overtime; SO = Shootout

Semifinals
On March 28, 2003, the quarterfinals best-of-five series opened.

OT = Overtime; SO = Shootout

The big surprise was the loss of Eisbären Berlin to the Krefeld Pinguine. The Eisbären were considered a strong favorite as they finished the regular season with 109 points vs. the Penguins 78.

Finals
The final series started April 11, 2003 with a homegame for the Kölner Haie who were the higher placed team after the regular season.

OT = Overtime; SO = Shootout

With this, the Krefeld Pinguine won the German title for the second time in their history. They almost accomplished this feat with a playoff sweep; this was somewhat unexpected, as their regular season record was not indicative of the playoff performance.

Top players

References

1
Ger
Deutsche Eishockey Liga seasons